The 1973–74 Duke Blue Devils men's basketball team represented Duke University in the 1973–74 NCAA Division I men's basketball season. The head coach was Neill McGeachy and the team finished the season with an overall record of 10–16 and did not qualify for the NCAA tournament.

Schedule

References 

Duke Blue Devils men's basketball seasons
Duke
Duke Blue Devils men's basketball
Duke Blue Devils men's basketball